Dischidiopsis is a genus of plant in the dogbane family, Apocynaceae, first described as a genus in 1904. One species (D. papuana) is native to New Guinea, while all the others endemic to the Philippines.

Species

References

Apocynaceae genera
Asclepiadoideae